The 63rd edition of the KNVB Cup started on 6 September 1980; the final was played on 28 May 1981: AZ from Alkmaar (at the time called AZ'67) beat Ajax 3–1 and won the cup for the second time. During the quarter and semi-finals, two-legged matches were held.

Teams
 All 18 participants of the Eredivisie 1980-81
 All 19 participants of the Eerste Divisie 1980-81
 9 teams from lower (amateur) leagues

First round
The matches of the first round were played on September 6 and 7, 1980.

1 Eerste Divisie; A Amateur teams

Second round
The matches of the second round were played on November 15 and 16, 1980. The Eredivisie clubs entered the tournament here.

E Eredivisie

Round of 16
The matches of the round of 16 were played on January 24 and 25, 1981.

Quarter finals
The quarter finals were played on February 25 and April 1, 1980.

Semi-finals
The semi-finals were played on April 14 and May 12, 1980.

Final

AZ also won the Dutch Eredivisie championship, thereby taking the double. They would participate in the European Cup, so finalists Ajax could play in the Cup Winners' Cup.

See also
 Eredivisie 1980-81
 Eerste Divisie 1980-81

References

External links
 Netherlands Cup Full Results 1970–1994 by the RSSSF

1980-81
1980–81 domestic association football cups
KNVB Cup